The Plaza is the tallest building in Salisbury, North Carolina. When built between 1909 and 1911, at seven stories tall, it was believed to be the tallest building in North Carolina. Called The Grubb Building for owner Clay Grubb, the Renaissance Revival skyscraper was one of four buildings in the town designed by architect Frank Milburn. When Grubb died in 1913, he still owed $122,500, and his building was sold at auction. The Wallace Family bought the building for $115,000 in 1914 and it became known as the Wallace Building. Ralph and Anne Ketner bought the Wallace Building in 1989, renovated it and gave it to the city. It now has offices and residences.  It is located in the Salisbury Historic District.

The Ketners required the city to keep the building for at least 30 years. Because most of the building's uses were private, the city decided it should not be spending so much money on it. The city agreed in October 2022 to a request for proposals for purchase and development with existing tenants respected.

References 

Buildings and structures in Salisbury, North Carolina